Vriesea biguassuensis is a plant species in the genus Vriesea. This species is endemic to Brazil.

References

biguassuensis
Flora of Brazil